Atle Nymo (born 9 June 1977) is a Norwegian jazz musician (tenor saxophone and bass clarinet), and the younger brother of Jazz saxophonist Frode Nymo. He is known for his contributions with the orchestras Motif, one of his main projects, and Trondheim Jazz Orchestra in which he has worked with Jazz greats like Pat Metheny and Chick Corea.

Career 
Nymo was born in Valnesfjord near Fauske. He joined the Bodø Big Band, led by his teacher Henning Gravrok, and was later educated on the Jazz program at Trondheim Musikkonservatorium, and has also played in Håvard Stubø's Quintet North. The later years He has played with Ole Morten Vågan's band Motif where he was to be named «Young Jazz Comets» 2001 at Copenhagen Jazz Festival. In «next MGN Trio» he cooperates with Mats Monstad and Ketil Gutvik, and in the latter band «Gutvik5».  Otherwise, and also played with Kaizers Orchestra.

Nymo also has his own album release with «Atle Nymo & Frode Nymo Quartet» (Håkon Mjåset Johansen drums and Ole Morten Vågan bass). In his own band «Atle Nymo Quartet» he cooperates with Vigleik Storaas (piano), Magnus Forsberg (drums) and Ole Morten Vågan (bass).  The first mentioned played in Quintet with guest Roger Kellaway (piano), and they released an album Inner Urge in 2001 with concert recordings from «Oslo Jazz Festival». Together with Ingebrigt Håker Flaten and Håkon Mjåset Johansen he made the album Complete communion in 2006, and with the Swedish trumpet player Magnus Broo as the fourth member, the group was called IPA and they have released the albums Lorena (2009), It's A Delicate Thing (2011) and Bubble (2013). He is also involved in two other band projects «Saxwaffe» (Frode Nymo, Klaus Holm, Eirik Hegdal, Espen Reinertsen) and «Juxtaposed» (Petter Vågan, Erik Nylander, Ole Morten Vågan)

Nymo is a frequently used big band musician and is attending such as the drummer Børre Dalhaugs «Big Band Blast» (2004) and trombonist & composer Helge Sundes «Denada» (2005), and was from 2002 to 2003 a member of Geir Lysne Listening Ensemble. He also played in Trondheim Jazz Orchestra, and attended the orchestra's cooperation projects with Chick Corea in 2000/2001 (Moldejazz) and Pat Metheny in 2003.

Honors 
«Young Jazz Comets» 2001 ved Copenhagen Jazz Festival, with the band Motif

Discography 

With «Atle Nymo & Frode Nymo Quartet»
2004: Inner Urge – (Gemini Records/Taurus Records), live at «Oslo Jazz Festival» in 2002, with Roger Kellaway piano (compositions by Joe Henderson, Chick Corea and Sonny Rollins

Within Børre Dalhaug's «Bigbandblast»
2004: Bigbandblast! (Real Records)

With Motif
2005: Motif (AIM Music Prod.)
2005: Expansion (AIM Music Prod.)
2008: Apo Calypso (Jazzland Records)
2008: Hello..my name is (Vidzone)
2010: Facienda (Jazzland Records), triple album
2011: Art Transplant (Clean Feed), with Axel Dörner
2016: My Head Is Listening (Clean Feed)

Within Trondheim Jazz Orchestra
2005: Live in Molde (MNJ Records), with Chick Corea

Within IPA including with Magnus Broo, Håkon Mjåset Johansen & Ingebrigt Håker Flaten
2009: Lorena (Bolage)
2011: It's A Delicate Thing (Bolage)
2013: Bubble (Moserobie), feat. Mattias Ståhl

Within The Rainbow Band
2011: The Rainbow Band Sessions (Losen Records), directed by John Surman

Within Kåre Nymark Band
2012: New Surroundings (Schmell)

Within Hilde Louise Asbjørnsen
2012: Månesjuk (Sweet Morning Music/Grappa Music)

References

External links 

Norwegian jazz saxophonists
Norwegian jazz composers
Taurus Records artists
Musicians from Fauske
Living people
1977 births
21st-century saxophonists
Ensemble Denada members
Trondheim Jazz Orchestra members
Motif (band) members